Pterolophia ploemi is a species of beetle in the family Cerambycidae. It was described by Lacordaire in 1872. It is known from Java, Borneo, and Malaysia.

References

ploemi
Beetles described in 1872